Taigen Sōshin (太源宗真, died 1370) was a Sōtō Zen monk. He received dharma transmission from Gasan Jōseki and is considered a patriarch by the Sōtō school.

1370 deaths
Zen Buddhist monks
Japanese Buddhist clergy
Year of birth unknown